Narciso Lubasa (born 7 March 1989) is an Angolan-German footballer who plays as a midfielder for Mittelrheinliga club SV Eintracht Hohkeppel.

He played for Alemannia Aachen in the 2. Bundesliga until their relegation to the 3. Liga in summer 2012.

References

External links

1989 births
Angolan emigrants to Germany
Living people
German footballers
Association football midfielders
2. Bundesliga players
Regionalliga players
Oberliga (football) players
Alemannia Aachen players
SV Eintracht Trier 05 players
VfL Oldenburg players
KFC Uerdingen 05 players
BSV Schwarz-Weiß Rehden players